was a town located in Sawa District, Gunma Prefecture, Japan.

As of 2003, the town had an estimated population of 18,603 and a density of 763.04 persons per km2. The total area was 24.38 km2.

On January 1, 2005, Akabori, along with the town of Sakai, and the village of Azuma (all from Sawa District), was merged into the expanded city of Isesaki and no longer exists as an independent municipality.

External links
 Official website of Isesaki 

Dissolved municipalities of Gunma Prefecture
Isesaki, Gunma